Midnight Raiders is a video game developed by American studio Stargate Productions and published by Sega for the Sega CD.

Gameplay 

Midnight Raiders is a game where the player starts off as an Apache gunner, then later operates on foot and then in a jeep.

Reception 

Next Generation reviewed the game, rating it two stars out of five, and stated that "It's a step up from Masked Rider Z, but frankly, that's not saying much."

Reviews
GamePro (Apr, 1995)
Game Players - Feb, 1995
Video Games & Computer Entertainment - Apr, 1995

References

External links 
 Midnight Raiders at GameFAQs
 Midnight Raiders at Giant Bomb
 Midnight Raiders at MobyGames

1994 video games
Full motion video based games
Rail shooters
Sega video games
Sega CD games
Sega CD-only games
Video games developed in the United States